Adam Hay may refer to:

 Sir Adam Hay, 7th Baronet (1795–1867), MP for Linlithgow Burghs 1826–30
 Adam Hay (died 1775), MP for Peeblesshire 1767–68 and 1775

See also 
 Hay (surname)